Verzeille is a railway station in Verzeille, Occitanie, France. The station is on the Carcassonne–Rivesaltes line. The station is served by TER (local) services operated by the SNCF.

Train services
The following services currently call at Verzeille:
local service (TER Occitanie) Carcassonne–Limoux

References

Railway stations in France opened in 1876
Railway stations in Aude